Hachmeister-Lind was a Pittsburgh-based chemical maker and auto parts business, which applied mirror finishes to a portion of auto light bulbs. The treated light bulbs, called Perfect-o-Lite, cut down the glare of the lights and directed the beam over a wider area of the road. The company operated during the Great Depression in the 1930s. It had a physical address at 211 Wood Street and a mailing address at Dept. L-570, in Pittsburgh.

Diverse inventory

The corporation also maintained a light and mastic tile division. A separate department
manufactured different kinds of plasters used in wall finishes. Aside from floor coverings and lights,
the company sold more than 600 chemicals. The most significant chemicals it made were used in the electroplating industry.

Profitability

In the latter half of
1931 Hachmeister-Lind's earnings amounted to $30,000 per month, or, approximately $244,686 for the full year. This widely exceeded the firm's 1930 revenue, which totaled $133,247.

Radio sponsor

Hachmeister-Lind sponsored episodes of The Shadow during January and February 1932.

Bankruptcy

The company filed for bankruptcy in August 1934, in Federal District Court of the western district of Pennsylvania. Its address at the time was
Island Avenue and Leonard Avenue in McKees Rocks, Pennsylvania.

References

External links
Hachmeister-Lind Ad, Circa 1935, retrieved on August 27, 2009.
Hachmeister-Lind Ad from Popular Science, August 1931 retrieved on August 27, 2009.

Manufacturing companies based in Pittsburgh
Chemical companies of the United States
Defunct automotive companies of the United States
Defunct manufacturing companies based in Pennsylvania